Meghan Beesley (born 15 November 1989) is an English track and field athlete specialising in the 400 metres hurdles. She competed at the 2013 World Championships narrowly missing the final. Earlier in her career, she also competed in the heptathlon. Beesley broke the world record for the rarely contested straight 200 metres hurdles by 0.69 seconds at the 2014 Great City Games in Manchester.

Competition record

Personal bests
 200 metres – 23.53 (Birmingham 2015)
 400 metres – 52.79 (La Chaux-de-Fonds 2011)
 100 metres hurdles – 13.21 (Loughborough 2015)
 400 metres hurdles – 54.52 (Beijing 2015)

Indoor
 200 metres – 23.56 (Birmingham, UK 2018)
 400 metres – 52.80 (Vienna 2013)

References

1989 births
Living people
Sportspeople from Blackpool
English female hurdlers
British female hurdlers
Commonwealth Games silver medallists for England
Commonwealth Games medallists in athletics
Athletes (track and field) at the 2010 Commonwealth Games
Athletes (track and field) at the 2018 Commonwealth Games
Universiade medalists in athletics (track and field)
Universiade bronze medalists for Great Britain
Medalists at the 2011 Summer Universiade
World Athletics Championships athletes for Great Britain
World Athletics Indoor Championships medalists
British Athletics Championships winners
Athletes (track and field) at the 2020 Summer Olympics
Olympic athletes of Great Britain
Medallists at the 2010 Commonwealth Games